Conzelman is a surname. Notable people with the surname include:

Jimmy Conzelman (1898–1970), American football player and coach, baseball executive, and advertising executive 
Joe Conzelman (1889–1979), American baseball player

See also
Conzelmann